Jonathan Demme was an American film director, producer and screenwriter of film and television

Feature films

Second unit director
 Fly Me (1972)
 The Hot Box (1972)

Documentary

Television

Music videos

Acting roles

References 

Demme, Jonathan